Barukh she'amar (baruch sheamar, or other variant English spellings), is the opening blessing to pesukei dezimra.

According to authorities beginning with Jacob b.

According to Or Zarua II, Barukh she-Amar contains 87 words, which number is the gematria of the Hebrew word paz meaning "refined gold.". An alternative text is printed in some Sephardic prayer books, often alongside the more common version.

Purpose
Barukh she'amar acts as a transition in the prayer service. In the Syrian tradition, the common melody for the prayer is derived from that of Hatikvah.

Origin
According to Jacob b. Asher and Isaac Aboab I, Barukh she-Amar is described by the Sefer Hekhalot, though no extant manuscript contains this reference. Moses b. Jacob, Amram b. Sheshna, Natronai b. Hilai, and Saadia b. Joseph attest to its popular use by the 9th century. According to the Mishneh Torah, this prayer was instituted by the Great Assembly;  claims "this is the best of the praises, because it was not established by the Great Assembly but rather was given to the wise tradents by way of a note from heaven."

In the Sephardic and Oriental liturgy, as well as Nusach Sefard, the custom is to recite most of the additional psalms of Shabbat (except for Psalms 92 and 93) prior to Barukh she-Amar on Shabbat.

Aspects of God
There are seven aspects of God mentioned in Barukh she'amar. These are:

 God spoke and the world came to be.
 God speaks, does, decrees, and fulfills.
 God is merciful.
 God rewards those who fear Him.
 God is eternal.
 God rescues and redeems people.
 Blessed is God's name.

Halakhah
Barukh she'amar becomes the initial part of the daily Jewish morning prayer, in "history-periods" of serious difficulty for the whole Jewish people; when there are not persecutions, ongoing diasporas or anything else serious for the Jews, Shacharit begins as always.

References

External links
 A nonliteral translation of the prayer

Pesukei dezimra
Jewish blessings
Siddur of Orthodox Judaism
Hebrew words and phrases in Jewish prayers and blessings